Loosies (also known as Love Is Not a Crime and Pick Pocket) is a 2012 romantic comedy-drama film written and produced by Peter Facinelli, and directed by Michael Corrente. The film stars Peter Facinelli, Jaimie Alexander, Michael Madsen, Joe Pantoliano, William Forsythe, Christy Carlson Romano, Glenn Ciano, Vincent Gallo and Chad A. Verdi.

Synopsis
Bobby Corelli (Facinelli), a New York pickpocket, enjoys the free lifestyle he has until one day he is confronted by a former one-night stand, Lucy Atwood (Alexander), who informs him she is three months pregnant with his child. She gives him a chance to leave his daily life and take responsibility for his child.

Cast

 Peter Facinelli as Bobby Corelli
 Jaimie Alexander as Lucy Atwood
 Michael Madsen as Lieutenant Nick Sullivan
 Vincent Gallo as "Jax"
 William Forsythe as Captain Tom Edwards
 Christy Carlson Romano as Carmen
 Marianne Leone as Rita Corelli
 Joe Pantoliano as Carl
 Glenn Ciano as Gomer
 Eric Phillips as Donny
 Tom DeNucci as Detective Jeffrey
 Tom Paolino as Detective Verdi
 Ara Boghigian as Officer
 Johnny Cicco as Adam, The Stoner
 Benny Salerno as Man On Subway
 Darin Berry as Man On Subway #2
 Tyler and Travis Atwood as Mickey / Mikey 
 David Goggin as NYPD Officer

Production
The film was shot on location in Providence, Rhode Island, and New York.

Release
The film was limited released on November 2, 2011, and wide released on January 11, 2012 and finally released on the DVD on March 13, 2012. The film was rated PG-13 by Motion Picture Association of America for some sexual content, violence and language used in the film.

International distribution
The International distribution rights of 'Loosies' a.k.a. 'Pick Pocket' are being licensed by Cinema Management Group.

Reception

Box office
Loosies has grossed $3,519 in North America, and $421,859 in other territories, for a worldwide total of $425,378.

Critical response
On review aggregator website Rotten Tomatoes, the film holds an approval rating of 22%, based on 18 reviews, and an average rating of 3.8/10. On Metacritic, which assigns normalized rating to reviews, the film has a weighted average score of 35 out of 100, based on 11 critics, indicating "generally unfavorable reviews".

References

External links
  (IFC Films)
  (Verdi Films)
 
 

2012 romantic comedy-drama films
2012 films
American romantic comedy-drama films
2010s English-language films
Films set in 2011
Films scored by Chad Fischer
2012 comedy films
2012 drama films
Films directed by Michael Corrente
2010s American films